The Evangelical Reformed Church of the Canton of Lucerne or in German the Evangelisch-Reformierte Kirche des Kantons Luzern is a Reformed state church in the Canton of Lucerne, Switzerland.

In 2004 it had 43,000 members, 18 parishes and 35 ordained clergy. It has Presbyterian-Synodal church government. Congregations are founded in Aesch, Adligenswil, Alberswil, Altishofen, Altwis, Baldegg, Ballwil, Beromünster, Bramboden, Buchrain, Buchs, Büron, Buttisholtz, Dagmersellen, Dierikon, Doppleschwand, Ebersecken, Ebikon, Egolzwil, Eich, Emmen, Entlebuch, Ermensee, Ecshenbach, Escholzmatt, Ettiswil, Fischbach, Flühli, Geiss, Gelfingen, Gettnau, Geuensee, Gisikon, Greppen, Grossdietwil, Grosswangen, Gunzwil, Hamikon, Hasle, Heiligkreuz, Hergiswil, Herlisberg, Hertenstein, Hildisrieden, Hitzkirch, Hochdorf, Hohenrain, Honau, Horw, Inwil, Kleinwangen, Knutwil, Knottwil, Kriens, Kulmerau, Lieli, Luzern, Littau, Luthern, Malters, Marbach, Mauensee, Meggen, Meierskappen, Menznau, Mosen, Nebikon, Neudorf, Nottwil, Oberkirch, Ohmstahl, Pfaffnau, Retcshwil, Rickenbach, Root, Romoos, Ruswil, Schenkon, Schötz, St. Erhardt, Sulz, Sursee, Triengen, Uffikon, Ufhusen, Vitznau, Wauwil, Weggis, Werthenstein, Wiggen, Wikon, Wilihof, Wolhusen, Zell.

It is a member of the Federation of Swiss Protestant Churches, and subscribes to the Leuenberg Concordia (1973). The ordination of women and the blessing of same-sex unions are allowed.

References

External links 
Evangelisch-Reformierte Kirche des Kantons Luzern 

Canton of Lucerne
Lucerne
Lucerne